Charles Nalden  (born John Leslie Simpson; 16 March 1908 – 17 June 2002) was a British and New Zealand musician and professor at the University of Auckland.

Born out of wedlock, at the age of 29 days Nalden was accepted into the Thomas Coram Foundation for Children and his birth name was changed. For 25 years, from the age of 14, he was in the British Army rising to bandmaster. Three months before his 40th birthday, he arrived in Auckland, New Zealand, to join the academic staff of the then Auckland University College, later the University of Auckland, where he rose to professor in 1956. He remained there until his retirement in 1974, and was conferred with the title of professor emeritus.

Honours
In the 1976 Birthday Honours, Nalden was appointed a Commander of the Order of the British Empire, for services to music.

References

1908 births
2002 deaths
Musicians from London
British musicians
British emigrants to New Zealand
New Zealand musicians
Academic staff of the University of Auckland
New Zealand Commanders of the Order of the British Empire